Kahit Sandali (The Best of Jennylyn Mercado) is the third album of singer/actress/host Jennylyn Mercado. This 14-track album was produced and released by GMA Records in May, 2008.

It is also the last album of Mercado under the said recording company, before she transferred to Viva Records.

Track listing

References

2008 albums
Jennylyn Mercado albums
GMA Music albums